Events from the year 1610 in Sweden

Incumbents
 Monarch – Charles IX

Events

 - Moscow is taken by Jakob De la Gardie during the De la Gardie Campaign.
 4 July - Battle of Klushino
 - Ingrian War

Births

 30 July - Lorens von der Linde,  (died 1670) 
 - Karin Thomasdotter, vogt  (died 1697)

Deaths

 - Catherine Vasa, princess  (died 1539)

References

External links

 
Years of the 17th century in Sweden
Sweden